Chatak Chandni is a Marathi movie released in November 1982.

Cast 
The cast includes Jayshree T., Prakash Bhende, Lalita Pawar, Nilu Phule, Dhumal, Bal Karve and others.

Soundtrack
The music has been composed by Shrikant Telang, while lyrics have been written by Sudhir Moghe.

Track listing

References

External links 
 
 Prakash Bhende - Official Website
 Movie Album - gaana.com

1982 films
1980s Marathi-language films